Rebel (formerly Rebel Sport) is an Australian sport equipment and related apparel chain.

History
Rebel Sport was established in 1985 with its first store in Bankstown. After being listed on the Australian Securities Exchange in 1993, it was purchased by Harvey Norman in July 2001. 

Archer Capital acquired Amart Sports in 2004. Amart was a big format sports store headquartered in Queensland. Archer Capital also merged its acquisitions of South Australian-based Rowe & Jarman, smaller format stores doing business in Western Australia, South Australia, Northern Territory, Victoria and Tasmania to complement Amart Sports. Rowe & Jarman became known as Amart Sports. In 2007, Archer Capital acquired Rebel Sports and consolidated its sports retail businesses into it.

In 2011, Amart Sports was acquired by Super Retail Group. In 2017, the Amart Sports brand was discontinued and merged into the Rebel Sport brand. The merger was designed to allow a focus on a single sporting goods brand and reduce costs.

Rebel stocks a number of well known international brands, including Nike, Asics, Adidas, PUMA and Under Armour. As a group, Rebel Sport (aka rebel) has more than 150 stores across Australia, and employ over 4,500 employees. In 2012, Rebel Sport dropped the word "sport" from its name and adopted a new logo and black and yellow branding.

Ell & Voo is a Activewear brand owned by Rebel.

Sponsorships
On 25 November 2015, rebel signed on as Women's Big Bash League's naming rights sponsor and also become the official online retail store of Cricket Australia.

References

Clothing companies established in 1985
Clothing retailers of Australia
Companies formerly listed on the Australian Securities Exchange
Retail companies established in 1985
Sporting goods manufacturers of Australia
Sporting goods retailers of Australia
Super Retail Group
1985 establishments in Australia